Carlo Rezzonico (25 April 1724 – 26 January 1799) was a cardinal of the Roman Catholic Church. He is sometimes referred to as The Younger to distinguish him from his uncle Pope Clement XIII who also bore the name Carlo Rezzonico.

Biography
Rezzonico was born on 25 Apr 1724 in Venice, Italy. On 21 Mar 1773, he was consecrated bishop by Giovanni Francesco Albani, Cardinal-Bishop of Porto e Santa Rufina, with Giuseppe Maria Contesini, Titular Archbishop of Athenae, and Orazio Mattei, Titular Archbishop of Colossae, serving as co-consecrators. He served as Vice-Chancellor of the Holy Roman Church (1758–1763), Camerlengo of the Holy Roman Church (1763–1799) and Secretary of the Roman Inquisition (1777–1799). He was also bishop of Sabina (1773–1776) and Bishop of Porto e Santa Rufina (1776–1799). As Cardinal Camerlengo he participated in the papal conclave, 1769 and papal conclave, 1774-1775.

He belonged to the Zelanti faction and defended the Society of Jesus against the accusations that finally led to the suppression of this order.

References

Cardinal-nephews
18th-century Italian cardinals
Cardinal-bishops of Porto
Cardinal-bishops of Sabina
Members of the Holy Office
Camerlengos of the Holy Roman Church
1724 births
1799 deaths